Fontainejean Abbey, otherwise Fontaine-Jean Abbey ( or Fontaine-Jean), was a Cistercian monastery in the commune of Saint-Maurice-sur-Aveyron in the Gâtinais in the département of Loiret, France.

It was founded in 1124 as a daughter house of Pontigny Abbey by Miles de Courtenay, who had previously also founded Les Écharlis Abbey. Fontainejean became the burial place of the Courtenay family. It was occupied by Protestant troops in 1562, when the church was ruined. The abbey was suppressed during 1791 in the French Revolution.

Little remains of the structures except for the north arm of the transept of the church with chapels and part of the wall of the choir, and also part of the 13th-century grange.

Sources
 Bernard Peugniez, 2001: Routier cistercien. Abbayes et sites. France, Belgique, Luxembourg, Suisse (pp.110-111; new expanded edition). Éditions Gaud: Moisenay 
 Eugène Jarossay: Histoire de l'abbaye de Fontaine-Jean de l'ordre de Cîteaux, 1124-1790: avec pièces justificatives et gravures (382 pp). Orléans: H. Herluison, 1894

External links 

 Cister.net: Fontaine-Jean
 Moumentum.fr: Ruines de l'abbaye de Fontainejean  

Cistercian monasteries in France
Christian monasteries in Loiret
1124 establishments in Europe
1120s establishments in France
Christian monasteries established in the 12th century
Monasteries dissolved during the French Revolution